Schizopygopsis anteroventris is a species of ray-finned fish endemic to China. It occurs in the upper Mekong and Salween River drainages in Tibet. Little is known about its ecology, apart from it being recorded from rivers.

Schizopygopsis anteroventris grows to  SL.

References

Schizopygopsis
Fish of the Mekong Basin
Freshwater fish of China
Endemic fauna of Tibet
Fish described in 1989